William Thomas Twine (16 January 1898 – 20 October 1977) was an English professional golfer. He was a regular competitor in the Open Championship and had a best finish of 11th in 1934. He never won an important individual tournament, his best finish being in the 1932 Dunlop-Southport Tournament where he tied with Henry Cotton but lost the 36-hole playoff by a single shot.

Tournament wins
1925 Kent Professional Championship
1931 Kent Professional Championship
1936 Addington Foursomes (with J A Flaherty)
1938 Addington Foursomes (with J A Flaherty)

Results in major championships

Note: Twine only played in The Open Championship.

CUT = missed the half-way cut
"T" indicates a tie for a place

Team appearances
Seniors vs Juniors (representing the Juniors): 1928
England–Ireland Professional Match (representing England): 1932 (winners)

References

English male golfers
People from Hayling Island
1898 births
1977 deaths